Allen Turner (20 September 1913 – 20 March 2009) was an Australian rules footballer who played for the North Melbourne Football Club in the Victorian Football League (VFL).

Notes

External links 

1913 births
2009 deaths
Australian rules footballers from Victoria (Australia)
North Melbourne Football Club players